Rodrigo D: No Future is a 1990 Colombian drama film directed by Víctor Gaviria. It was entered into the 1990 Cannes Film Festival.

Cast
 Ramiro Meneses - Rodrigo D
 Carlos Mario Restrepo
 Jackson Idrian Gallego
 Vilma Díaz
 Óscar Hernández 
 Irene de Galvis
 Wilson Blandón
 Leonardo Favio Sánchez
 Johana Hernández

References

External links

1990 films
Punk films
1990s Spanish-language films
1990 drama films
Films directed by Víctor Gaviria
Colombian drama films